Gert Jõeäär (born July 9, 1987) is an Estonian road bicycle racer, who rides for Estonian amateur team CFC Spordiklubi. From 2013 to 2016, Jõeäär competed with UCI Professional Continental cycling team .

Major results
Source: 

2005
 5th Road race, UEC European Junior Road Championships
2006
 3rd Time trial, National Under-23 Road Championships
2008
 1st  Time trial, National Under-23 Road Championships
 8th Time trial, UEC European Under-23 Road Championships
2009
 National Road Championships
3rd Time trial
4th Road race
 3rd Tallinn–Tartu GP
2010
 3rd Time trial, National Road Championships
2011
 1st Stage 4 Ronde de l'Oise
 National Road Championships
2nd Time trial
5th Road race
 9th Grand Prix de la ville de Nogent-sur-Oise
 9th Tallinn–Tartu GP
 9th Tartu GP
2012
 National Road Championships
2nd Road race
4th Time trial
 8th Overall Ronde de l'Oise
1st Stage 2
2013
 1st  Overall Tour of Estonia
1st Stage 1b (ITT)
 3rd Time trial, National Road Championships
 4th Tro-Bro Léon
2014
 National Road Championships
1st  Time trial
2nd Road race
 1st  Overall Driedaagse van West–Vlaanderen
1st Prologue
 6th Overall Tour of Estonia
2015
 National Road Championships
1st  Time trial
1st  Road race
2016
 1st  Time trial, National Road Championships
 6th Overall Boucles de la Mayenne
2017
 National Road Championships
1st  Road race
2nd Time trial
 8th Overall Tour of Estonia
1st Stage 2
2018
 National Road Championships
2nd Road race
5th Time trial
 3rd Overall Baltic Chain Tour
1st Prologue
 9th Overall Tour of Estonia
2019
 3rd Road race, National Road Championships
2020
 1st  Overall Baltic Chain Tour
1st  Points classification
1st Stage 3
2022
 3rd Road race, National Road Championships

References

External links

1987 births
Living people
Estonian male cyclists
Sportspeople from Tallinn